The Saba'a Stele, also known as the Saba'a Inscription, is a boundary stone inscription of the reign of Adad-nirari III (811 to 783 BC) discovered in 1905 in two pieces in Saba'a, Sanjak of Zor, south of the Sinjar Mountains in modern Syria. It is the primary source for the military campaigns of Adad-nirari III.

The stele was erected by one of Adad-Nirari's officers, Nergalerish. The text consists of 33 lines in seven sections: a dedication, the genealogy of Adad-Nirari III, a description of Adad-Nirari III's campaign to Palestine in year 5, a tribute from Mari, King of Damascus, erection of a statue in Zabanni, introduction of Nergalerish and curses.

The third section, describing a campaign in year 5, has received the most focus from scholars. The text as translated by Daniel David Luckenbill as below:

The term "Pa-la-áš-tu" has been translated as either Palestine or Philistia by scholars.

See also 

 Calah Slab
 Tell al-Rimah stela

References

External links
 Reliefstele Adadniraris 3 aus Saba'a und Semiramis (1916)

9th-century BC steles
8th-century BC steles
1905 archaeological discoveries

Assyrian stelas
Assyrian inscriptions
History of Palestine (region)
Collection of the Istanbul Archaeology Museums
Philistia